Barwino  is a village in the administrative district of Gmina Kępice, within Słupsk County, Pomeranian Voivodeship, in northern Poland.

The village has a population of 174.

References

Barwino